The role of women in religion describes the context of women who are members of religious faiths. These include:

Specific religions 
Baháʼí Faith and gender equality
Women In Buddhism
Women in Christianity
Women in the Catholic Church
Women in Mormonism
Women in Quakerism
Women in Hinduism
Women in Islam
Women in Judaism
Women in Sikhism
Women in Taoism

Feminism 
Feminist theology
Buddhist feminism
Christian feminism
Mormon feminism
Islamic feminism
Jewish feminism

Religious roles 
Ordination of women in Christian traditions
Anglicanism
Catholic church
Church of Scotland
Methodism
Women as imams
Women as rabbis
Women as theological figures